Greg Collins may refer to:

Greg Collins (American football) (born 1952), American actor and former NFL player
Greg Collins, drummer with Radio 4 (band)
Greg Collins, fictional private detective featured in the radio program It's a Crime, Mr. Collins
Greg Collins (record producer), musician & record producer